The 2019–20 Southern Combination Football League season was the 95th in the history of the competition, which lies at levels 9 and 10 of the English football league system.

The provisional club allocations for steps 5 and 6 were first announced by the FA on 19 May 2019.

This season was also the first season the sin bin rule applied to this level of football.

League suspension and season abandonment
On 16 March 2020, both the Football Association and the Sussex County Football Association announced that all football competitions for Non-League football would be put on hold until further notice due to the coronavirus pandemic. A video conference between the FA and other leagues at levels 9 and 10 was held on 24 March with a view to start proceedings whether to cancel null the league or to award promotion or relegation based on points per game.

As a result of the COVID-19 pandemic, this season's competition was formally abandoned on 26 March 2020, with all results from the season being expunged, and no promotion or relegation taking place to, from, or within the competition. On 30 March 2020, sixty-six non-league clubs sent an open letter to the Football Association requesting that they reconsider their decision.

Premier Division

The Premier Division consists of 20 clubs, the same as last season, after Arundel and Shoreham were relegated to Division One, and Chichester City were promoted to Isthmian League Division One South.

Three clubs joined the division:
 Alfold – promoted from Division One
 Steyning Town Community – promoted from Division One
 Horley Town – transferred from Combined Counties Football League Premier Division

Premier Division table at time of abandonment
Final table standing before the league was abandoned and expunged

Results table

Top scorers
Correct as of 26 March 2020

Stadia and locations

Broadbridge Heath moved to their new ground, called High Wood Hill, after playing at Broadbridge Heath Leisure Centre between 1987 and 2019.

Division One

Division One remains at 18 clubs after Alfold and Steyning Town were promoted to the Premier Division. One new club joined:

 Arundel – relegated from the Premier Division
 Roffey – promoted from Division Two
 Shoreham – relegated from the Premier Division

Division One table at time of abandonment
Final table standing before the league was abandoned and expunged

Results table

Top scorers
Correct as of 26 March 2020

Stadia and locations

Division Two

Division Two remained at 15 teams and features two new clubs after Roffey were promoted to Division One:
St Francis Rangers – who withdrew from Division One during the 2018–19 season, re-entered as an intermediate team.
 TD Shipley – promoted from the West Sussex Football League

Angmering Seniors changed their name to Angmering Village

Promotion from this division depends on ground grading as well as league position.

League table at time of abandonment
Final table standing before the league was abandoned and expunged

Results table

Top scorers
Correct as of 26 March 2020

Stadia and locations

Peter Bentley League Challenge Cup
Source 2019-20 Peter Bentley Challenge Cup

First round

Second round

Third round

Quarter-final

Semi-final

Final

Division One Challenge Cup
Source SCFL Fixtures and Results

First round

Second round

Quarter-final

References

External links
 Southern Combination Football League

9
Association football events curtailed and voided due to the COVID-19 pandemic
2019-20